East of Chicago Pizza is a restaurant chain based in Lima, Ohio offering different styles of pizza, buffalo wings, breadsticks, and subs. They have 80 restaurants in Ohio, Indiana, and West Virginia. The first restaurant was opened in 1982 as the Greenwich Pizza Barn in Greenwich, OH.

East of Chicago Pizza Company corporate headquarters is now located in Lima, Ohio. It was purchased by a franchisee, Tony Collins, in 2008.

The company was the ranked at 41st position nationally in sales among U.S. pizza companies in 2009.

See also
 List of pizza chains of the United States

References

External links
 Official website

Pizza chains of the United States
Restaurants in Ohio
Restaurants established in 1982
1982 establishments in Ohio
American companies established in 1982